Kenneth Dean 24 February 1927 – 20 September 2017() was an English professional rugby league footballer who played in the 1940s, 1950s and 1960s.

Background
Ken Dean was born in Halifax, West Riding of Yorkshire, England, and he died aged 90.

Playing career

International honours
Ken Dean won caps for England while at Halifax in 1951 against Other Nationalities, and in 1952 against Other Nationalities.

County Honours
Ken Dean won caps for Yorkshire while at Halifax.

County League appearances
Ken Dean played in Halifax's victories in the Yorkshire County League during the 1952–53 season, 1953–54 season, 1955–56 season and 1957–58 season.

Challenge Cup Final appearances
Ken Dean played  in Halifax's 4-4 draw with Warrington in the 1953–54 Challenge Cup Final during the 1953–54 season at Wembley Stadium, London on Saturday 24 April 1954, in front of a crowd of 81,841, played  in the 4-8 defeat by Warrington in the 1953–54 Challenge Cup Final replay during the 1953–54 season at Odsal Stadium, Bradford on Wednesday 5 May 1954, in front of a record crowd of 102,575 or more, and played  in the 2-13 defeat by St. Helens in the 1955–56 Challenge Cup Final during the 1955–56 season at Wembley Stadium, London on Saturday 28 April 1956, in front of a crowd of 79,341,

County Cup Final appearances
Ken Dean played  in Halifax's 22-14 victory over Hull F.C. in the 1954–55 Yorkshire County Cup Final during the 1954–55 season at Headingley Rugby Stadium, Leeds on Saturday 23 October 1954, in front of a crowd of 25,949, played  in the 10-10 draw with Hull F.C. in the 1955–56 Yorkshire County Cup Final during the 1955–56 season at Headingley Rugby Stadium, Leeds on Saturday 22 October 1955, in front of a crowd of 23,520, and played  in the 7-0 victory over Hull F.C. in the 1955–56 Yorkshire County Cup Final replay during the 1955–56 season at Odsal Stadium, Bradford on Wednesday 2 November 1955, in front of a crowd of 14,000.

Club career
Ken Dean made his début for Halifax on Saturday 6 November 1948, and played his last match for Halifax on Saturday 5 March 1960.

Testimonial match
Ken Dean's Testimonial match at Halifax took place in 1958.

Honoured at Halifax
Ken Dean is a Halifax Hall Of Fame Inductee.

Genealogical information
Ken Dean was married to Winifred (née Hopkinson). They had children; David J. Dean, and Janet Dean.

Funeral
Ken Dean's funeral and cremation took place at 1.30pm on Thursday 5 October 2017 at Park Wood Crematorium, Elland.

References

External links
(archived by web.archive.org) The 1954 Rugby League Challenge Cup Final replay
Dean's tribute to 'a great pal' Stan Kielty
At last: Rugby League tells its story
Obituary - Ken Dean
Ken Dean Obituary

1927 births
2017 deaths
England national rugby league team players
English rugby league players
Halifax R.L.F.C. players
Rugby league five-eighths
Rugby league players from Halifax, West Yorkshire
Yorkshire rugby league team players